McJunkin is an Irish surname. Notable people with the surname include:

Daniel Mcjunkin, American Revolutionary patriot
Ebenezer McJunkin (1819–1907), Republican member of the US House of Representatives from Pennsylvania
George McJunkin (1851–1922), the African American cowboy in New Mexico who discovered the Folsom Site in 1908
John F. McJunkin (1830–1883), American politician
Joseph McJunkin (1755–1846), American Revolutionary War patriot serving in the battle of Kings Mountain, North Carolina
Katherine McJunkin, American biologist

See also
Thomas-McJunkin-Love House, historic home located at Charleston, West Virginia
Matt McJunkins (born 1983), American musician

References